Live at the Masquerade is a live CD/DVD combination released by Thousand Foot Krutch. The CD/DVD includes live recordings of many of their songs such as "Puppet", "What Do We Know", "Absolute", "Rawkfist", and several songs of their previous album Welcome to the Masquerade.
It is their first live project, and their first Live CD/DVD, Recorded by TFK Live at Rexall Place, which is now Northlands Coliseum in Edmonton, Alberta, in front of an excess of 20,000 people. The guitar was played by American musical artist Ty Dietzler.

Track listing

Personnel
 Trevor McNevan - vocals
 Steve Augustine - drums
 Joel Bruyere - bass, backing vocals
 Ty Dietzler - guitar
 Nick Baumhardt - keyboards
 Mastered By: Troy Glessner

References

2011 albums
Thousand Foot Krutch albums
Tooth & Nail Records albums
Christian live video albums